Jesús Fuentes (born 15 November 1957) is a Spanish former swimmer who competed in the 1976 Summer Olympics.

References

1957 births
Living people
Spanish male freestyle swimmers
Olympic swimmers of Spain
Swimmers at the 1976 Summer Olympics
20th-century Spanish people